Everybody Wants a Piece is an album by Joe Louis Walker.

The album received a Grammy Award nomination for Best Contemporary Blues Album.

Track listing
"Everybody Wants a Piece" (Joe Louis Walker) – 5:03 	
"Do I Love Her" (Taj Mahal) – 3:02 	
"Buzz on You" (Richard Fleming, Tom Hambridge) – 5:01 	
"Black & Blue" (John Bradford, Walker) – 5:57 	
"Witchcraft" (Cy Coleman, Carolyn Leigh) – 	5:12 	
"One Sunny Day" (Danny Kirwan) – 4:33 	
"Gospel Blues" (Bradford, Anthony Cage, Walker, Phillip Young) – 5:54 	
"Wade in the Water" (traditional) – 6:25 	
"Man of Many Words" (Buddy Guy) – 3:14 	
"Young Girls Blues" (Bradford, Cage, Walker, Young) – 4:15 	
"35 Years Old" (Joe Russo, Walker) – 4:08

References

2015 albums
Blues albums by American artists